The Petah Tikva Troopers are an amateur American football team based in Petah Tikva, Israel. The Troopers compete in the Israel Football League.

History 

The Troopers began their inaugural season in 2011 and had limited success during their first five seasons. However, in 2017 they reached the semifinals after a 9-1 regular season and in 2018 they reached their first Israel Bowl, when they were defeated by the Jerusalem Lions, 28-20, in Israel Bowl XI.

Sponsorship 

The Troopers are sponsored by Mike's Place, a bar and restaurant chain in Israel.

Stadium 

The Troopers play their home games at HaMoshava Stadium in Petah Tikva.

References 

American football teams in Israel
Sport in Petah Tikva
American football teams established in 2011
2011 establishments in Israel